Nick Farrell (born December 17, 1975) is a retired boxer from Canada.

Farrell was born in East York, Ontario. He competed in the light middleweight (< 71 kg) division at the 1996 Summer Olympics in Atlanta, Georgia. There he was stopped in the first round by Kazakhstan's eventual bronze medalist  Yermakhan Ibraimov.

External links
 Canadian Olympic Committee

1975 births
Living people
Light-middleweight boxers
Boxers at the 1996 Summer Olympics
Olympic boxers of Canada
People from East York, Toronto
Boxers from Toronto
Canadian male boxers